Christopher Stubbs (born March 12, 1958) is an experimental physicist currently on the faculty at Harvard University in both the Department of Physics and the Department of Astronomy. He is the current Dean of Science at Harvard University and a former Chair of Harvard's Department of Physics.

Biography
Stubbs received an International Baccalaureate degree from Iranzamin International School in Tehran and received a B.Sc. in physics from the University of Virginia in 1981. He received his Ph.D. in physics from the University of Washington in 1988 working with Professor Eric Adelberger on experimental tests of gravity.  His Ph.D. thesis ruled out the idea of a fifth force, a proposed long range modification of gravity.

Current Projects
Large Synoptic Survey Telescope (LSST)
Probing Dark Energy with galaxy clusters. 
Precise calibration of astronomical instruments.
Builder status on the PanSTARRS Project. 
Testing foundations of gravity with lunar laser ranging, the Apache Point Observatory Lunar Laser-ranging Operation
Arms Control.

Past Projects
Laboratory tests of the equivalence principle (with EotWash group, University of Washington)
Member of MACHO gravitational microlensing project, a search for dark matter in the Milky Way that ruled out astrophysical objects as being the dark matter in our Galaxy.
Member of High-z Supernova Search Team, co-discovered the so-called dark energy
Lead Scientist of the ESSENCE supernova cosmology survey, which is probing the nature of the Dark Energy.
Past Project Scientist for the Large Synoptic Survey Telescope (LSST)

Awards
 Packard Fellow David and Lucile Packard Foundation
 1999, Fellow, American Physical Society. 
1996: NAS Award for Initiatives in Research from the National Academy of Sciences
2007: Gruber Prize in Cosmology (co-recipient with High-z Supernova Search Team)
 2015: Breakthrough Prize in Fundamental Physics, shared with Brian P. Schmidt, Adam Riess, and the High-Z Supernova Search Team.

References

External links
Christopher Stubbs
Data on Asteroid Stubbs, 11713
Google Scholar citations

1958 births
Living people
21st-century American physicists
Experimental physicists
Harvard University faculty
University of Washington alumni
University of Virginia alumni
Fellows of the American Physical Society